"Captain" Peter Janson  (born 10 April 1940 in New Zealand) is an Australian socialite and former motor racing driver.

Janson was born in New Zealand, emigrating to England at a young age. In 1967, he moved to Australia and settled in Melbourne.

Janson, who listed his occupation as "Gentleman", established a playboy penthouse in the Federal Hotel before moving to the Hotel Windsor. In the 1980s he moved to Rutherglen House. Janson is renowned for the parties he throws, and was a pioneer in transforming the Melbourne Cup into a major event on the Australian social calendar.

Motor racing

Janson was a competitor in Australian Touring Car Racing. He made 19 Bathurst 1000 starts between 1973 and 1992 primarily in Holden Toranas and Commodores, finishing second in 1979 and 1980 and third in 1977 (all of his podium finishes were with Larry Perkins who would go on to be a six time winner of the race). With the end of the Group C era in 1984, Janson closed his team but continued to drive for other teams including joining Sydney based privateer Garry Wilmington in a V12 Jaguar XJS in the 1985 and 1986 races. He later scored a class win and fourth outright driving a BMW M3 with fellow Kiwi Trevor Crowe at the 1988 Bathurst 1000. Janson's last appearance at Bathurst was in 1992 where he and Bob Jones finished 20th in a Holden VL Commodore SS Group A SV.

Always a colourful character who gave his sponsors a plug at every opportunity, especially when being interviewed in the pits, Janson briefly changed his name by deed poll in the mid-1970s to NGK Janson to circumvent a rule that only allowed a driver's name to be carried above the window line. His former co-driver Larry Perkins also told that one year on a parade lap at Bathurst, Janson continually pulled the car off onto the grass in order to throw Cherry Ripe chocolate bars out to the crowd (his major sponsor being Cadbury Schweppes).

Career results
Results sourced from Driver Database.

Complete World Endurance Championship results
(key) (Races in bold indicate pole position) (Races in italics indicate fastest lap)

Complete Australian Touring Car Championship results
(key) (Races in bold indicate pole position) (Races in italics indicate fastest lap)

Complete World Touring Car Championship results
(key) (Races in bold indicate pole position) (Races in italics indicate fastest lap)

† Not eligible for series points

Complete Bathurst 1000 results

References

Australian socialites
Australian Touring Car Championship drivers
New Zealand racing drivers
New Zealand rally drivers
1940 births
Living people
Australian Endurance Championship drivers